The Leviathan Movement is a neo-fascist political organisation in Serbia, that identifies as an animal rights organisation. It is led by Pavle Bihali.

History 
It was formed in 2015 as an animal rights organisation that seek to protect animals. In 2016, the movement became popular when videos of the members of organisation rescuing animals showed up on social media, as well as videos of them offering compensation for information on animal abusers. Initially, the movement only focused on animal rights issues, exposing animal abusers, and taking their animals away from them. However, the movement has shifted from solely being an animal rights group to openly talking about political issues, mainly illegal immigration. In 2020, the organisation announced that they will be forming a party that will participate in the 2020 parliamentary election, in a coalition with the far-right anti-vax "I live for Serbia" movement.

Its leader, Pavle Bihali, appeared under a Russian minority ballot list for the 2022 election which was ultimately rejected by the Republic Electoral Commission (RIK) because it did not collect enough valid signatures. According to CeSID, the ballot list did not support minority rights, but far-right politics. This was later overturned by the Constitutional Court, and on 22 March, RIK confirmed the ballot list.

Ideology and controversies 
Leviathan has been described as neo-fascist, neo-Nazi, and alt-right party, and it is positioned on the far-right on the political spectrum. It has been heavily criticised for its anti-human rights behaviour. It has been also described as a satellite party of the Serbian Progressive Party. In November 2018, the leaders of the movement, Pavle Bihali and Aleksandar Buhanac were arrested for making threats on Facebook, but soon after they were released. Even after this, he continued threatening people on social media, including minors.

In April 2020, members of the movement took the family dog of a Romani family away from them, claiming that the dog was abused and that it was used for dog fights. However this claim was denied by the people living in the neighbourhood. Not long after, a member of Leviathan drove through the gate of a refugee camp in Obrenovac, threatening to run over the refugees. After the attacker was arrested, the members of the movement protested in front of the camp.

In October 2020, police in Belgrade have arrested six members of Leviathan who are suspected of beating one person earlier that month.

Electoral results

Parliamentary elections

See also
Far-right politics in Serbia

References

Far-right political parties
Far-right politics in Serbia
Nationalist parties in Serbia
Serb nationalist parties
Animal rights organizations
Political parties established in 2020
Neo-Nazi organizations
Neo-Nazism in Serbia
Alt-right organizations